Abdilqadir Ali Omar  is a Somali politician and Scholar. He previously served as Minister of Interior of Somalia.
 
Omar was the first deputy and general chairman of Islamic Courts Union and lead the resistance against the Ethiopian invasion of Somalia.

References

1950 births
Living people
Somalian politicians